Petras Vaitiekūnas (born 26 March 1953, in Liudvinavas, Marijampolė County) is a Lithuanian politician who was the foreign minister of Lithuania from 2006 to 2008.

Petras Vaitiekūnas was a signatory to the Lithuanian declaration of independence in 1990 and a member of the Lithuanian Supreme Council from 1990 to 1992. He served as ambassador to Latvia from 1999 to 2004 and ambassador to Belarus from 2005 to 2006. He was appointed Foreign Minister of Lithuania on 12 July 2006.

References

Living people
1953 births
Ambassadors of Lithuania to Latvia
Ambassadors of Lithuania to Belarus
Ministers of Foreign Affairs of Lithuania
Ambassadors of Lithuania to Ukraine
Recipients of St. George's Order of Victory